Mike Adamson may refer to:
 Mike Adamson (baseball) (born 1947), American baseball player
 Mike Adamson (rugby union) (born 1984), Scottish rugby union player and referee
 Mike Adamson (footballer) (born 1949), Scottish footballer

See also
 Michael Adamson (born 1971), Canadian painter